The fourth season of La Voz... México premiered on September 7, 2014 and concluded on December 14 of the same year. The Coaches that were part of this season were: Ricky Martin, Laura Pausini, Julión Álvarez and Yuri, having Jacqueline Bracamontes as host and Paty Cantú as backstage host.

Coaches 

After announcing that for the third time no coach from the previous season would be present, the first coach confirmed by the media was Julión Álvarez, who was announced along with the first promos of the season. A couple of weeks later, Laura Pausini would be announced as the second coach.
On July 23, producer Miguel Ángel Fox confirmed, during a radio broadcast, that the third and fourth coaches of La voz… México will be Ricky Martin and Yuri, and then on August 11, the same producer jointly presented the coaches of the new edition through an interview.

Teams 
Color key

 Winner
 Runner-up
 Third place
 Fourth place
 Eliminated in the Semifinals
 Eliminated in the Playoffs
 Eliminated in the Knockouts
 Stolen in the Battles
 Eliminated in the Battles

Rounds 

This season contained Five rounds: the First Stage was the Blind Auditions, where each Trainer recruited 16 participants; the Second was The Battles where each Trainer divided his team in half and The Robbery gave each Trainer the opportunity to steal three participants from another team thus passing with 11 participants; the Third was The Knockouts where each Trainer reduced their teams again by facing two or three participants, where only 5 passed; the Fourth round was the Playoffs where only 2 participants per Coach, the semifinalists of each Team, passed to the Fifth and Last Stage, the Live Shows.

Blind Auditions 

The objective of each coach will be to choose 16 participants during the six episodes of Auditions.

Episode 1 (September 7) 

The coaches performed "We Will Rock You" at the beginning of the episode. During the course of the program Ricky Martin performed "Pégate" and Laura Pausini & Yuri performed "Cielito Lindo"

Episode 2 (September 14) 

During the show, the Mexican singer, winner of The Voice of Poland (season 4), Juan Carlos Cano made an appearance along with Alejandra Guzmán singing Dream On and Aunque me mientas.

Episode 3 (September 21) 

During the show, "Maldita primavera" was performed as a duet by Yuri and Laura Pausini, in Spanish and Italian

Episode 4 (September 28)

Episode 5 (October 5) 
During the course of the show Ricky Martin sang his song Vuelve, for the studio audience. Also, Alex Hoyer from team Ricky, Lizeth and Lisbeth from team Yuri, Saak from team Pausini and Mike Miramontes from team Julión shared a moment with Austin Mahone and sang a fragment of "Mmm Yeah", by the singer himself

Episode 6 (October 12)

The Battles 
The Battle Round started on October 19. Contestants who win their battle or are stolen by another coach will advance to the Top 3 Round. The coaches will face 2 participants from their team in a duet, choosing one to pass the round, the other being eliminated from their team, in addition, each coach is awarded 3 "Steals", giving the opportunity to save losing participants advancing like this with 11 participants to the Knockouts. This is the first in 3 consecutive seasons to have no saves after battles, with non-steal eliminations being definitive exits from the competition. The winner and stolen participants will advance to the Knockouts round. The co-coaches in this edition were Mario Domm for team Ricky, Álex Ubago for team Pausini, Ricardo Montaner for team Julión and Poncho Lizárraga for team Yuri.

Color key:

The Knockouts 

The Knockout round included episodes 11 and 12. Each coach again reduced their teams through Deathmatches, four duos and one trio, with one winner each moving on to the next stage, the Playoffs. The participants will not know who their opponents will be until the moment of the presentation. With no more steals or rescues, the decisions would be final, the coach choosing one participant to advance, the others being automatically eliminated.

Color key:

The Playoffs 
The Top 20 artist of this season will face each other individually. The decision will be based on the interpretive quality of the participant and the strategy of their coach. At the end of this episode, the eight finalists of this edition will be announced, two per team. The coach will name their participants who will have to go on stage and perform the assigned song, being the next participant called at the end of each performance, being the 2 best selected at the end.

Reception 

This season of The Voice had a mixed reception in the media, having both positive and negative reviews within the same providers.
The negative notes tended to focus on the controversy generated by artists considered "Professionals" within the format, the main one mentioned being Natalia Sosa who has a long career and is considered a reference in musical theater. This controversy was gaining strength from the audition when Natalia chose Yuri as her coach, whom she had previously met personally, despite the fact that the singer from Veracruz denied a close relationship in each interview, describing Natalia as an "acquaintance". Another well-known contestant to hit the stage was Xava Drago, ex-vocalist of the band CODA, who was not selected for any team after his blind audition. Drago's performance caused controversy within the broadcast. Drago assured: "I'm happy, I'm cool, I sang, they treated me well, it did make me crazy because of the way the judges treated me, but that's how it is, they're not the first people who don't like me." He also denied the versions that say he received a payment for participating in the broadcast. In the positive notes, an increase in the impact of the coaches was considered, counting on what to date is considered the most diverse and renowned panel within the broadcasts in Mexico, competing against the one from the second season (The first panel of coaches of 4 different nationalities).

References 

Mexico